The Maniacal Vale is the fifth studio album by the British funeral doom metal band Esoteric. It is a double album and was released on 26 June 2008 through Season of Mist records. Engineered, mixed and mastered by Esoteric at Priory Recording Studios. Artwork by Kati Astraeir.

Track listing
Lyrics, music and arrangements on both discs by Esoteric.

Disc 1

Disc 2

Credits
 Gordon Bicknell - Guitar
 Mark Bodossian - Bass
 Greg Chandler - Vocals, Guitar
 Joe Fletcher - Drums
 Olivier Goyet - Keyboards

References

External links
  The Maniacal Vale @ esotericuk.net

2008 albums
Esoteric (band) albums
Season of Mist albums